Persona 4: The Animation is an anime television series based on Atlus' PlayStation 2 video game, Persona 4. The story revolves around Yu Narukami, a young teenager who moves to the town of Inaba, where a mysterious string of murders is taking place. Upon discovering a distorted TV World and acquiring a mysterious power known as "Persona", Yu and his friends decide to investigate the murders and save others from being killed.

The first series, produced by AIC ASTA and directed by Seiji Kishi, aired in Japan between October 2011 and March 2012 on MBS, TBS, CBC, and Animax, with an original video animation episode released in August 2012. A condensed film adaptation, Persona 4: The Animation -The Factor of Hope-, was released in Japanese theaters in June 2012. The series was licensed by Sentai Filmworks in North America and by Kazé and Manga Entertainment in the United Kingdom. Critical reception to the anime series has been generally positive as it has been considered a faithful adaptation of the video game despite criticism to the pacing and animation issues. A second adaptation based on the game's PlayStation Vita port, titled Persona 4: The Golden Animation, aired in Japan between July and September 2014. Unlike the first series, this adaptation was produced by A-1 Pictures and is licensed in North America by Aniplex of America.

Plot

The story follows Yu Narukami, a quiet teenager who moves to Inaba to live with his uncle and cousin for a year due to his parents working abroad. After looking into a rumor about a mysterious 'Midnight Channel' that appears on televisions during rainy days, Yu and his new friends, Yosuke Hanamura and Chie Satonaka, discover a strange world hidden inside the television, inhabited by strange monsters known as Shadows and a curious bear-like creature named Teddie. It is here that Yu awakens a mysterious power known as 'Persona', which allows him to fight against the Shadows. Yu and his friends soon discover that this TV World is related to a mysterious string of murders, in which dead bodies appear during foggy days. With the Midnight Channel warning them of potential victims, Yu and his friends, along with Teddie, form an investigation team dedicated to rescuing people who are thrown into the TV before they fall prey to the Shadows and finding the culprit behind the incidents. As the story progresses, the team rescue various people who become their new allies after overcoming their own Shadows and gaining Personas of their own, including Chie's best friend, Yukiko Amagi, delinquent Kanji Tatsumi, idol Rise Kujikawa, and young detective Naoto Shirogane. Together, Yu and his companions face up against the threat of the Shadows whilst also making the best of their youthful school life.

Persona 4: The Golden Animation expands on the series with additional scenarios adapted from the Golden version of the game, in which Yu encounters Marie, a girl from the mysterious Velvet Room who is seeking to regain her memory.

Production and release

In the initial Persona 4 game, the main character is known simply as the Protagonist. However, the anime adaptation gives him the name Yu Narukami. During an interview, game director Katsura Hashino drew attention to the way in which the Protagonist remains silent and emotionless throughout the game. This leaves the player to discern what emotions the character should have shown at any particular point. Hashino elaborated on this particular character trait creating an obstacle for Persona 4: The Animations director Seiji Kishi since the character would undoubtedly have to speak and show some level of emotion. In the same interview, Kishi admitted the difficulty of the silent Protagonist's transition into the anime without destroying what Hashino had already established.

The anime television adaptation of the game, produced by AIC ASTA and directed by Seiji Kishi, aired for 25 episodes on MBS between October 6, 2011 and March 29, 2012.  The series features most of the returning cast from the video game, whilst voice recordings for Igor were taken from the game as his actor, Isamu Tanonaka, died in January 2010. Aniplex released the series on DVD and Blu-ray Disc between November 23, 2011 and August 22, 2012, with the first volume containing a director's cut of the first episode and a bonus CD single. An additional 26th episode, featuring the story's true ending, was included in the 10th BD/DVD volume released on August 22, 2012. Sentai Filmworks licensed the series in North America, simulcasting it on Anime Network as it aired and releasing the series on DVD and Blu-ray in two collective volumes on September 18, 2012 and January 15, 2013 respectively. Like the Japanese version, the English dub retains many of the original voice actors from the English version of the game. Kazé and Manga Entertainment released the series in the United Kingdom in three BD/DVD combi boxsets released between December 24, 2012 and July 22, 2013. Due to licensing issues, the North American BD releases omit the Japanese audio track, though it is still present on DVD releases, as well as all UK releases. A film recap of the series, titled Persona 4: The Animation -The Factor of Hope-, was released in Japanese theaters on June 9, 2012, featuring a condensed version of the story and new scenes of animation. Sentai re-released the series on September 29, 2015 in a Blu-ray/DVD Combo Collector's Edition boxset. The Blu-rays include both Japanese and English audio tracks.

On May 1, 2014, Atlus announced that a second anime television adaptation titled Persona 4: The Golden Animation, is being produced by A-1 Pictures. The series aired on MBS' Animeism programming block between July 10, 2014 and September 25, 2014. Based on the PlayStation Vita port of the game, Persona 4 Golden, the series focuses on new scenarios not featured in the previous series, largely revolving around Yu's encounter with the game's new character, Marie. The series is directed by Tomohisa Taguchi with Kishi serving as chief director, and features the returning cast from the previous games and anime.  The fourth BD/DVD volume, released on December 10, 2014, includes an OVA episode depicting an alternate ending. Aniplex of America has licensed the series in North America, simulcasting the series on Crunchyroll, Hulu, and Daisuki, as well as their own Aniplex Channel, as it aired. The series was released on two subtitled Blu-ray Disc volumes on July 21, 2015 and September 29, 2015 respectively.

Music
The series' songs and music were composed by Shoji Meguro, who had previously worked on the original game. Additionally, Tetsuya Kobayashi primarily wrote the soundtrack for The Golden Animation.

The first series, Persona 4: The Animation, used several pieces of theme music; five opening themes and five ending themes. The two main opening themes are "sky's the limit" by Shihoko Hirata, used for the first twelve episodes, and "key plus words" by Hirata and Yumi Kawamura, used for episodes thirteen onwards. The original broadcast version of the first episode uses "Pursuing My True Self" by Hirata, originally recorded for the video game. The opening themes for episodes 9 and 15 respectively are "True Story" by Rise Kujikawa (Rie Kugimiya) and "Burn My Dread" by Kawamura, a song originally used in the Persona 3 video game. The ending theme for episode 25, the "True End" OVA, and the film is "Never More" by Hirata, originally recorded for the video game.

For Persona 4: The Golden Animation, the main opening and ending themes respectively are "Next Chance to Move On" and "Dazzling Smile", both performed by Hirata. The opening theme for the first episode is "Shadow World" by Hirata, originally recorded for the video game. In episode 11, Kana Hanazawa performs the song "Dazzling Smile" for the ending theme. Returning themes include "key plus words", used as the opening theme for episode 8, and "Never More", used as the ending theme of episode 12.

Soundtrack CDs

Reception
The anime series has generally received positive critical response by publications for anime, manga and other media. Blu-ray's Jeffrey Kauffman was initially skeptical about the plot until the revelation of the supernatural and wondered how appealing would be the case's outcome. A reviewer from T.H.E.M. Anime Reviews noted that while the pacing and the animation often had issues "Persona 4: The Animation is about as good an adaptation of the video game as you could hope for". Consistent praise was given to the characterization of the silent protagonist from the video game which involved being a deadpan snarker as well as his development across the series that made him a more fleshed character.

Critical reaction to the second anime series has been mixed with critics finding it would appeal only to fans of the original series. They have also agreed Marie lacks the appeal of the other major recurring characters who are more popular within the fandom.

References
General

Specific

External links

 Persona 4: The Animation Official website 
 Persona 4: The Golden Animation Official website 
 
 

2011 anime television series debuts
A-1 Pictures
Anime films based on video games
Anime International Company
Anime television series based on video games
Animeism
Fantasy anime and manga
Megami Tensei anime
Mystery anime and manga
Persona (series)
School life in anime and manga
Sentai Filmworks
Supernatural anime and manga
Mainichi Broadcasting System original programming